The Mater Misericordiae University Hospital, commonly known as the Mater ( "matter"), is a major teaching hospital, based at Eccles Street, Phibsborough, on the northside of Dublin, Ireland. It is managed by Ireland East Hospital Group.

History

The hospital was founded as an initiative of Catherine McAuley of the Sisters of Mercy and was officially opened by Daniel Murray, Archbishop of Dublin, on 24 September 1861. Mater misericordiae means "Mother of Mercy" in Latin, a title of the Virgin Mary and alludes to its founders, the Sisters of Mercy. Electric light, a major step in the improvement of endoscopy, was first used by Sir Francis Cruise, to allow cystoscopy, hysteroscopy and sigmoidoscopy as well as the examination of the nasal (and later thoracic) cavities at the hospital in 1865. It became the first hospital in Ireland to remain open 24 hours a day when it dealt with a cholera epidemic in 1886.

In 2003, the National Pulmonary Hypertension Unit, the leading centre for the treatment of pulmonary hypertension in Ireland, was established at the hospital and, in 2008, the hospital became the first public hospital in Ireland to offer percutaneous aortic valve replacement.

Services
The hospital, which is a teaching hospital for the University College Dublin, has 665 beds. It contains a negative-pressure ventilation ward which houses the National Bio-Terrorism Unit.

See also
List of hospitals in the Republic of Ireland
Dublin Hospitals Rugby Cup

References

External links
Hospital Home Page

Teaching hospitals in Dublin (city)
Sisters of Mercy
Hospitals established in 1861
Health Service Executive hospitals
Voluntary hospitals
Hospital buildings completed in 1861
1861 establishments in Ireland
Catholic hospitals in Europe